Burnett is an unincorporated community in Industrial Township, Saint Louis County, Minnesota, United States.

The community is located 25 miles northwest of the city of Duluth at the intersection of Industrial Road (County 7) and Center Line Road.

State Highway 33 (MN 33) is nearby.  The Cloquet River flows through the community.

The communities of Alborn, Culver, Independence, and Brookston are all near Burnett.

A post office called Burnett was established in 1896, and remained in operation until 1982. The community was named for a railroad official.

References

 Rand McNally Road Atlas – 2007 edition – Minnesota entry
 Official State of Minnesota Highway Map – 2011/2012 edition

Unincorporated communities in Minnesota
Unincorporated communities in St. Louis County, Minnesota